Allotinus kudaratus is a butterfly in the family Lycaenidae. It was described by Takanami in 1990. It is found on the Philippines (Mindanao).

References

Butterflies described in 1990
Allotinus